Jones Academy may refer to:
 Jones Futures Academy - Houston, Texas - Houston Independent School District
 Jones Academy - Oklahoma
 Jimmy and Laura Jones Academy of Fine Arts and Dual Language - Arlington Independent School District - Arlington, Texas